HMAS Benalla (J323/M323), named for the city of Benalla, Victoria, was one of 60 Bathurst-class corvettes constructed during World War II, and one of 36 initially manned and commissioned solely by the Royal Australian Navy (RAN). Built by HMA Naval Dockyard in Victoria, Benalla was fitted out as armed survey ship instead of a minesweeper like the rest of the class, and was commissioned into the RAN in 1943.

Benallas duties included convoy escort and performing hydrological surveys prior to amphibious landing operations. The corvette was present at the Japanese surrender of Timor at the end of the war. Post-war, Benalla performed survey work around north-west Australia until late 1945. She was decommissioned in 1946, and sold for scrapping in 1958.

Design and construction

In 1938, the Australian Commonwealth Naval Board (ACNB) identified the need for a general purpose 'local defence vessel' capable of both anti-submarine and mine-warfare duties, while easy to construct and operate. Construction of the prototype  did not go ahead, but the plans were retained. The need for locally built 'all-rounder' vessels at the start of World War II saw the "Australian Minesweepers" (designated as such to hide their anti-submarine capability, but popularly referred to as "corvettes") approved in September 1939, with 60 constructed during the course of the war: 36 (including Benalla) ordered by the RAN, 20 ordered by the British Admiralty but manned and commissioned as RAN vessels, and 4 for the Royal Indian Navy.

Despite being part of a class of minesweepers, Benalla was fitted out as an armed survey ship. Minesweeping gear was not installed, and an extension to X deck housed a large chart room. Her role resulted in an increase from the standard ship's company of 85 to 107.

Benalla was laid down at HMA Naval Dockyard in Williamstown, Victoria on 24 March 1942. She was launched on 19 December 1942 by the wife of Arthur Drakeford, serving Minister for the Air, and commissioned on 28 April 1943.

Operational history
Benalla entered service on 2 June 1943, towing an ammunition lighter from Sydney to Brisbane. She worked her way up the eastern Australia coast to New Guinea, escorting a small convoy between Townsville and Milne Bay, where she would be based as a survey vessel for the rest of 1943. Arriving in New Guinea waters in late June, the corvette was immediately assigned to support the landing of United States troops on Kiriwina Island and Woodlark Island on 30 June during Operation Chronicle; these landings were unopposed as there were no Japanese soldiers on the islands. From July to September, Benalla and sister ship  led a Survey Group of vessels to perform hydrological surveys of the waters around Lae, Salamaua, and Finschhafen, in preparation of Australian troop landings at these locations. Benalla remained at Milne Bay until early December, when she proceeded to Sydney for refit.

Returning to survey work New Guinea in February 1944, the corvette was involved in the surveying of Seeadler Harbor and the waters around the Admiralty Islands following their capture by the United States as part of Operation Brewer in March and April. In August, she sailed for Brisbane to undergo a two-month refit. On 11 October, Benalla sailed for the Philippines via Hollandia, joining the escort of 20 Liberty ships on the second leg. In November, the corvette assisted frigate  in surveying San Pedro Bay, before resuming work in the New Guinea area. On 6 January 1945, Benalla was sent to Darwin and assigned to a Survey Group operating off the north-western coast of Australia. She spent four months with the group, then was assigned to Fremantle from 3 May to 20 July. Returning to Darwin, Benalla was assigned to a joint Australian-Dutch group heading for Koepang, and was present when the Japanese surrender of Timor was carried out aboard  on 11 September 1945.

The corvette was later awarded the battle honour "New Guinea 1943–44" in recognition of her wartime service.

Benalla resumed survey work off the north-west coast of Australia on her return from Timor, a role she would maintain until 2 November 1945, when she was ordered to Fremantle for decommissioning. The corvette was decommissioned into reserve on 28 January 1946. She was transferred from Fremantle to Melbourne, Geelong, then Sydney over the course of 1955 and 1956, and was sold to Mitsubishi Shoji Kaisha Ltd of Tokyo on 20 February 1958, who towed the vessel to Japan in April for scrapping.

Citations

References
Books

Journal and news articles

Bathurst-class corvettes of the Royal Australian Navy
Ships built in Victoria (Australia)
1942 ships
World War II corvettes of Australia
Survey ships of the Royal Australian Navy